Ravindra Sathe is an Indian playback singer in Marathi film industry. He was the original cast and crew member of famous Marathi theatre Ghashiram Kotwal.

Career

He started his career as sound recordist in Doordarshan. He has many performances of light music all over India. These include "Nakshtranche Dene", Diwali pahat etc.

Film singing
He has sung songs in various Marathi films. Some of them are -
 Samna (1975) 
 Jait Re Jait (1977)
 Aaitya Bilavar Nagoba (1979)
 Umbartha (1982)
 Aaj Jhale Mukt Mi (1986)
 Shivrayachi Soon Tararani (1993)
 Aai (1995)
 Chimani Pakhar (2000)

Famous Songs
 Kunachya khandyavar kunache oze ‘कुणाच्या खांद्यावर’
 Amhi Thakar Thakar 'आम्ही ठाकर ठाकर’
 Saanware Aai Jaiyo 'Yeshwant Movie'
 Marathi Abhimaangeet
 Ya dehi tuza sang 'या देही तुझा संग'
 Ran he uthale uthale रान हे उठले उठले
 Ganjalya Othas Mazya गंजल्या ओठास माझ्या (उंबरठा)

Awards and recognition

2015 - 1st Shahir Sable award by Maharashtra BJP

References

Living people
Bollywood playback singers
Indian male singers
Marathi playback singers
Place of birth missing (living people)
Marathi-language singers
1952 births